Bryantsville United Methodist Church, formerly known as Bryantsville Methodist Church, is a United Methodist church located in the area named Bryantsville in Garrard County, Kentucky near Lancaster.  The Romanesque style building was added to the United States National Register of Historic Places in 1985.  The records of this congregation date back at least to 1857, and the present structure was largely completed in 1920.

References

External links
Bryantsville United Methodist Church web site

National Register of Historic Places in Garrard County, Kentucky
United Methodist churches in Kentucky
Churches in Garrard County, Kentucky
Churches on the National Register of Historic Places in Kentucky
1920 establishments in Kentucky
Churches completed in 1920
Romanesque Revival architecture in Kentucky